Hector Victor Honoré Jr. (September 9, 1905 in Pittsburg, Kansas – March 3, 1983 in Pana, Illinois), was an American racecar driver, mechanic and owner.

Personal history
Following the death of his father, Hector's mother remarried and the family moved to Christian County, Illinois. They eventually settled in the town of Pana, Illinois where he operated a mechanic shop for several decades. He was married and had three daughters. He was brother-in-law of noted Baptist Evangelist Robert Sumner.

Racing career

After a briefly driving his own cars, Honore reached his greatest success as a car owner and mechanic with a number of drivers behind the wheel.  His legendary sprint car known as the "Black Deuce" is the winningest sprint car in history.

Sprint Car Season Racing Championships

 1941 - Midwest Dirt Track Racing Association (MDTRA) - Driver: Harold Shaw
 1946 - Midwest Dirt Track Racing Association (MDTRA) - Driver: Cliff Griffith
 1947 - Midwest Dirt Track Racing Association (MDTRA) - Driver: Cliff Griffith
 1955 - International Motor Contest Association (IMCA) - Driver: Bobby Grim
 1956 - International Motor Contest Association (IMCA) - Driver: Bobby Grim
 1957 - International Motor Contest Association (IMCA) - Driver: Bobby Grim
 1958 - International Motor Contest Association (IMCA) - Driver: Bobby Grim
 1959 - International Motor Contest Association (IMCA) - Driver: Pete Folse Sr.
 1960 - International Motor Contest Association (IMCA) - Driver: Pete Folse Sr.
 1961 - International Motor Contest Association (IMCA) - Driver: Pete Folse Sr.

Honored in Halls of Fame

 Inducted into National Sprint Car Hall of Fame & Museum in Knoxville, Iowa in 1991
 Inducted into Highbanks Hall of Fame in Belleville, Kansas in 2001

References

External links
National Sprint Car Hall of Fame
National Sprint Car Hall of Fame Honore Bio

1905 births
1983 deaths
Auto racing executives
National Sprint Car Hall of Fame inductees
People from Pittsburg, Kansas
Racing drivers from Kansas
People from Pana, Illinois